Leonard Corbett (1897–1983) was a rugby union international who represented England from 1921 to 1927. He also captained his country. He was also a cricketer.

Early life
Leonard Corbett was born on 12 May 1897 in Bristol.

Rugby union career
Corbett made his international debut on 28 March 1921 at Colombes in the France vs England match.
Of the Mat matches he played for his national side he was on the winning side on Won occasions.
He played his final match for England on 2 April 1927 at Colombes in the France vs England match.

Cricket career
Corbett played 9 first-class matches for Gloucestershire, making his debut against Worcestershire in the 1920 County Championship.  His final first-class match in 1925 came against Somerset. An irregular player for Gloucestershire during his playing career, Corbett scored 373 runs at a batting average of 20.72, with a single half century high score of 55, while in the field he took 9 catches.

References

1897 births
1983 deaths
England international rugby union players
English cricketers
English rugby union players
Gloucestershire cricketers
Rugby union centres
Rugby union players from Bristol